The Monopoly Bureau Building is a Renaissance-style red brick building located in Nan Chang Street, Taipei City, Taiwan. It is in the Zhongzheng District, near Aiguo West Road, Park Road and Nanchang intersection ring, and Taipei's city south gate. It is also located nearby the Republic of China Ministry of Finance and the President of the Republic of China's Official Residence. The building was built in 1913 during the Japanese rule of Taiwan.

The building was designed by the architect  and constructed in 1913 by the Kobe Group. The six-story tower topped with a spire is the most unusual feature of the building. In addition to a six-story tower, the building is also decorated with a copper roof.

The building housed the offices of the Monopoly Bureau of the Taiwan Governor's Office during Japanese rule and the Taiwan Tobacco and Wine Monopoly Bureau under ROC rule. It now houses the headquarters office for the Taiwan Tobacco and Liquor Corporation.

References

External links 

 Monopoly Bureau at the Bureau of Cultural Heritage website 

1913 establishments in Taiwan
Government buildings completed in 1913
Buildings and structures in Taipei
National monuments of Taiwan